In enzymology, a N6-hydroxylysine O-acetyltransferase is an enzyme that catalyzes the chemical reaction

acetyl-CoA + N6-hydroxy-L-lysine  CoA + N6-acetyl-N6-hydroxy-L-lysine

Thus, the two substrates of this enzyme are acetyl-CoA and N6-hydroxy-L-lysine, whereas its two products are CoA and N6-acetyl-N6-hydroxy-L-lysine.

This enzyme belongs to the family of transferases, specifically those acyltransferases transferring groups other than aminoacyl groups.  The systematic name of this enzyme class is acetyl-CoA:N6-hydroxy-L-lysine 6-acetyltransferase. Other names in common use include N6-hydroxylysine:acetyl CoA N6-transacetylase, N6-hydroxylysine acetylase, and acetyl-CoA:6-N-hydroxy-L-lysine 6-acetyltransferase.  This enzyme participates in lysine degradation.

References

 
 

EC 2.3.1
Enzymes of unknown structure